Feudal Barony of Castlehill is a Scottish feudal barony in Inverness, Scotland. Also called Auld Castlehill, it lies on the outskirts of the burgh of Inverness, between Culcabock, Drakies, and Culloden and it may be the hill where Macbeth's castle once was. The lands were thought to have been granted to the Cuthbert family by King Kenneth I in the 950s, however the first known charter erecting Castlehill into a barony is from King James III on 23 July 1478.  This charter was granted to William Cuthbert, grandson of George Cuthbert "who distinguished himself at the Battle of Harlaw".

The barony was held by the Cuthbert family until 1802.  When Lewis Cuthbert died in that year, the lands were sold to a London company and the title of baron became "dormant".  Research performed by Dr. Richard Culbert of Muirton and Brian Hamilton has determined that the current holder of the title is Simon Fraser, 16th Lord Lovat.

List of Barons of Castlehill 
The following is a list of Barons.

 George Cuthbert, 1st Baron of Castlehill (born 1360, date of death unknown), he is counted as the first Baron because he is referred to in the royal charter of 1478 as having been granted the barony after the Battle of Harlaw in 1411.
 John Cuthbert, 2nd Baron of Castlehill (born 1390, date of death unknown)
 William Cuthbert, 3rd Baron of Castlehill (born 1420, date of death unknown)
 Cuthbert, 4th Baron of Castlehill (born 1450, date of death unknown)
 John Cuthbert, 5th Baron of Castlehill, sheriff deputy of Inverness (1475–1548)
 George Cuthbert, 6th Baron of Castlehill, provost and sheriff deputy of Inverness (1510–1592)
 John Cuthbert, 7th Baron of Castlehill, Provost of Inverness (1540–1624)
 William Johnson Cuthbert, 8th Baron of Castlehill, provost, Baillie and sheriff deputy of Inverness (1570–1625)
 John Cuthbert, 9th Baron of Castlehill (1600–1677)
 George Cuthbert, 10th Baron of Castlehill (1635 – after 1724)
 John Cuthbert, 11th Baron of Castlehill (born 1668)
 George Cuthbert, 12th Baron of Castlehill, sheriff deputy of Inverness (1700–1748)
 Abbé Alexander (Cuthbert) Colbert, 13th Baron of Castlehill, Abbot of Gallican Church (1708–1782)
 Joseph Cuthbert, 14th Baron of Castlehill (1760–1783)
 George Cuthbert, 15th Baron of Castlehill, provost marshal of Jamaica (1748–1789)
 Lewis Cuthbert, 16th Baron of Castlehill, provost marshal of Jamaica (1737–1802)
 Simon Fraser, 17th Baron of Castlehill, 16th Lord Lovat, Chief of Clan Frasier of Lovat

References 

 Macbeth
Scottish feudal barons
Inverness
History of Scotland
Feudalism in Scotland
Baronies